Russell Jonathan Leetch (born 5 March 1982) is an English bass guitarist who plays with Birmingham-based indie rock band Editors. He studied music technology at Staffordshire University where he met his fellow Editors band members. He went to secondary school at Arden School, Knowle.

He used to work with bandmate Tom Smith in a call centre before the band got a record deal. His favourite bands are Radiohead and Spiritualized.

In February 2008, Leetch remixed The Hives single "T.H.E.H.I.V.E.S.", where it featured as a b-side on the single. He also directed the video to Editors single "Bones" which was released in Europe.

He ran the 2008 New York City Marathon for charity.  In April 2011 Leetch ran the London Marathon along with lead singer Tom Smith.  They raised over £10,000 for Oxfam.

He supports Aston Villa F.C.

References

External links
Russell Leetch Biography

Living people
1982 births
English rock bass guitarists
Male bass guitarists
English music video directors
People from Solihull
Alumni of Staffordshire University
Musicians from Birmingham, West Midlands
21st-century English bass guitarists
21st-century British male musicians
Editors (band) members